James Black (born August 15, 1969) is a Canadian former professional ice hockey forward who played eleven seasons in the National Hockey League with the Hartford Whalers, Minnesota North Stars/Dallas Stars, Buffalo Sabres, Chicago Blackhawks and Washington Capitals from 1989–90 to 2000–01.

Career 
Black was drafted 94th overall by the Hartford Whalers in the 1989 NHL Entry Draft. He played 352 career NHL games, scoring 58 goals and 57 assists for 115 points. His best offensive season was the 1998–99 NHL season when he achieved career highs in goals with sixteen, assists with fourteen, and points with thirty.

Career statistics

External links

1969 births
Living people
Binghamton Whalers players
Bolzano HC players
Buffalo Sabres players
Canadian ice hockey centres
Chicago Blackhawks players
Chicago Wolves (IHL) players
Dallas Stars players
EV Zug players
Grand Rapids Griffins players
Hartford Whalers draft picks
Hartford Whalers players
Sportspeople from Regina, Saskatchewan
Indianapolis Ice players
Iserlohn Roosters players
Kalamazoo Wings (1974–2000) players
Las Vegas Thunder players
Minnesota North Stars players
Portland Pirates players
Portland Winterhawks players
Rochester Americans players
Springfield Indians players
Washington Capitals players
Ice hockey people from Saskatchewan